Bonansa is a municipality located in the province of Huesca, Aragon, Spain. According to the 2010 census (INE), the municipality has a population of 102 inhabitants.

Bonansa is located in the central Pyrenees, close to the Spanish-French border. In a diverse natural spot near the Noguera Ribagorzana river.

Notable people
Joaquín Maurín (1896–1973), communist politician

References

Municipalities in the Province of Huesca